BlueStar (formerly "BlueStar PR"), "The Jewish Ink Tank", is a San Francisco-based nonprofit organization which produces "visual media that strengthens existing efforts to gain popular support and interest for Israel and Judaism." Blue Star  creates and distributes pro-Israel posters, rally signs, postcards, and brochures.  They also put up transit shelter ads and billboards. They also host  Write On For Israel/San Francisco, a one-year program to training future Israel leaders and advocates. The program is available for high school students, college students, and adults.

Clients

 The Israel Project, a prominent Israel advocacy group based in DC, distributed close to 20,000 copies of our posters and DVDs during both the Democratic and Republican conventions, and a second campaign to media outlets, and frequently highlights our materials in their research on Israel messaging
 StandWithUs, another prominent Israel advocacy group based in Los Angeles features a number of our fliers on their site and has paid for rally boards to counter anti-Israel protests
 American Israel Public Affairs Committee (AIPAC) the fifth largest Jewish lobbyist in Congress, displayed our materials during several State conventions to educate policy makers regarding Israel's positive attributes
 American Jewish Committee (AJC)
 Anti-Defamation League (ADL) has cooperated with BlueStar  to fight anti-semitism in San Francisco
 San Francisco Jewish Community Relations Council (JCRC) uses our posters, fliers and postcards to boost awareness for its JIMENA project and on campus;
 The Greater Washington D.C. JCRC used our posters to promote its "Bluestring" Solidarity with Israel campaign
 Israeli Consulates
 Zionist Organization of America used our fliers and DVDs to promote Israel's acceptance of gays and to highlight a gay Palestinian speaker's Israel boosting talks in more than 25 campuses
 More than 80 Congregations and Jewish day schools in North America
 Countless Hillel organizations on more than 100 campuses used our posters and requested customized posters to support Jewish and Israeli causes and to protest anti-Israeli speaking events.

History
BlueStar PR was founded in 2003, and was originally funded by the Richard and Rhoda Goldman Fund.  
 It has since changed its name to "BlueStar" and has become a non-profit organization which solicits donations.

References

External links
 Organization website
 Current poster gallery

Zionism in the United States
Jewish-American political organizations
Israel–United States relations